Colle San Magno (locally ) is a comune (municipality) in the Province of Frosinone in the Italian region Lazio, located about  southeast of Rome and about  southeast of Frosinone.

Its name refers to St. Magnus of Anagni. The town was founded in the 11th century, and it was later ruled by the D'Avalos and, from the 16th century, by the Boncompagni. In 1796 it was acquired by the Kingdom of Naples.

Attractions include the medieval castle, the old asphalt mines and the church of S.M. Assunta.

References

External links
 Official website

Cities and towns in Lazio